Results from Norwegian football in 1945.

Norwegian Cup

Final

Replay

Second replay

National team

References

 
Seasons in Norwegian football